Shambhunath Temple (Nepali language:शम्भुनाथ मन्दिर) is a Hindu temple in Eastern Nepal. The primary deity is Shiva.

History
The Shivalinga was founded in Chandrabhoga Gadhi and has been kept in same place. The temple was reconstructed in 1996. On the western side of the temple complex are ruins.

Pilgrimage
Every year thousands of pilgrims from Nepal, India and other countries visit Shambhunath Temple to worship the Shivalinga. During the festivals of Baishakh Purnima and Dashain there are even more worshipers.

References

External links

Hindu temples in Madhesh Province
Buildings and structures in Saptari District